Jorunna glandulosa is a species of sea slug, a dorid nudibranch, a shell-less marine gastropod mollusc in the family Discodorididae.

Distribution
This species was described from Ghana.

References

Endemic fauna of Ghana
Discodorididae
Gastropods described in 2011